Sivarampuram or Sivaramapuram is a village panchayat in Salur mandal of Parvathipuram Manyam district in Andhra Pradesh, India.

Geography
It has an average elevation of 113 meters (374 feet).

Demographics
 Indian census, the demographic details of Sivarampuram village is as follows:
 Total Population: 	2,357 in 605 Households
 Male Population: 	1,214 and Female Population: 	1,143
 Children Under 6-years of age: 413 (Boys - 205 and Girls - 208)
 Total Literates: 	1,085

References

Villages in Parvathipuram Manyam district